Frederick Martyn Trethewey (born 24 January 1949) was the Archdeacon of Dudley until his retirement in September 2013.

Trethewey was educated at St Austell Grammar School and Bedford College, London. He was ordained in 1978  and was a curate at St Mark's with St Anne's Tollington Park and St Andrew's Whitehall Park before becoming a team vicar at Hornsey then vicar of Brockmoor. He was Rural Dean of Himley from 1996 to 2001.

He was born in Cornwall and went to St Austell Boys Grammar School from 1960 to 1967.

References

1949 births
Living people
People educated at St Austell Grammar School
Alumni of Bedford College, London
People from Cornwall
Archdeacons of Dudley